The Méga Monte Carlo is a French sports car.

Design and development
In 1989, Fulvio Maria Ballabio designed a carbon fibre monocoque sports car under the newly established brand MCA (Monte Carlo Automobile). The car being born Monegasque, it was decided to name it the Centenaire for the 100 year anniversary of the Automobile Club of Monaco. Guglielmo Bellasi Joined him with his experience as a F1 constructor. The car was developed in 5 years. In March 1990, Guglielmo Bellasi travelled to Bologna to sign a contract for Lamborghini to supply its V12. In August of the same year, the car was presented to Prince Rainier of Monaco, an avid collector of automobiles. Unfortunately for MCA, the global financial environment meant a lower demand than expected for this type of car; only 5 were built between 1990 and 1992.

In 1993 a Georgian businessman bought the right for the car and the company and decided to race 'Le Mans' with a renamed 'Centenaire: MIG M100 (MIG standing for 'Migrelia & Georgia'). The experience was a complete failure, not passing qualification, being at best at the 30th position behind the leader.

Méga bought the project and contracted SERA-CD to redesign the car, renamed this time the Monte Carlo. Among other modifications, the Lamborghini engine was replaced with a V12 Mercedes engine. The car was finally presented at the 1996 Geneva Motor Show. The number produced is unknown and is believed to have ceased in 1999.

Performance

External links
 SERA: Car design company
 Mega Website

References

Cars of France

Cars introduced in 1996
Rear mid-engine, rear-wheel-drive vehicles